Herman Edward Murray (December 5, 1909 – November 27, 1998) was a Canadian ice hockey player who competed in the 1936 Winter Olympics.

Murray was the Captain of the 1936 Port Arthur Bearcats, which won the silver medal for Canada in ice hockey at the 1936 Winter Olympics. He scored five goals in eight matches at that tournament. Following the Olympics, Murray finished his playing career with the Royal Montreal Hockey Club, and was a member of that team when it won the 1939 Allan Cup.

In 1987 he was inducted into the Northwestern Ontario Sports Hall of Fame as a member of the 1936 Olympic team.

References

External links
profile

1909 births
1998 deaths
Canadian ice hockey defencemen
Ice hockey people from Montreal
Ice hockey players at the 1936 Winter Olympics
Medalists at the 1936 Winter Olympics
Montreal Royals players
Montreal Victorias players
Olympic ice hockey players of Canada
Olympic medalists in ice hockey
Olympic silver medalists for Canada